Beah: A Black Woman Speaks is a 2003 documentary about the life of Academy Award  nominated actress Beah Richards.  Directed by LisaGay Hamilton, it won the Documentary Award at the AFI Los Angeles International Film Festival in 2003, and a Peabody Award in 2004.

People featured
Beah Richards (archive footage)
Bill Cobbs
Ossie Davis
Ruby Dee
Lynn Hamilton
Hugh Harrell Jr.
Whitman Mayo
Ruby Milsap
Frank Silvera
Spencer Tracy (archive footage)

Awards
The film won the 2003 documentary award at AFI Fest and the 2005 Peabody Award. In 2004 it was nominated for three Black Reel Awards and an Image Award.

External links
Official site

 
Women Make Movies Documentary

2003 films
American documentary films
Documentary films about actors
Documentary films about women in film
Documentary films about African Americans
2003 documentary films
2000s English-language films
2000s American films